The Journal of Astrophysics and Astronomy is a peer-reviewed scientific journal of astrophysics and astronomy established in 1980. It is co-published bimonthly by Springer India, the Indian Academy of Sciences, and Astronomical Society of India. The journal is edited by Annapurni Subramaniam.

Indexing and abstracting
The journal is abstracted and indexed in the following bibliographic databases:

According to the Journal Citation Reports, the journal has a 2020 impact factor of 1.270.

References

External links

Publications established in 1980
Bimonthly journals
English-language journals
Astrophysics journals
Astronomy journals
Springer Science+Business Media academic journals